Kingshouse may refer to:
 Kingshouse, a hamlet in Stirling council area, formerly served by the Kingshouse railway station, which opened 1871 and closed 1965
 Kings House Hotel in Glen Coe, built in the 17th century
 King's House, Winchester, a late 17th-century planned royal palace in the English county of Hampshire, started 1683, structurally completed but never finished, gutted by fire in 1894 and demolished
 King's House School, an independent day preparatory school in Richmond, London, founded in 1947